AYS or Ays may refer to:

 About Your Sexuality, was a comprehensive sex education course from the Unitarian Universalist Association 
 Ay dynasty, a ruling lineage in south India
 The National Rail code for Aylesbury railway station in Aylesbury, United Kingdom
 The Eyeish people, also known as Ays, a Native American tribe from Texas
 Waycross-Ware County Airport, IATA code AYS, airport in Georgia, United States
 Amaysim Australia Ltd, a company listed on the Australian Securities Exchange